This is a list of notable events in country music that took place in the year 1951.

Events

Top hits of the year

Number one hits
(As certified by Billboard magazine)

Note: Several songs were simultaneous No. 1 hits on the separate "Most Played Juke Box Folk (later Country & Western) Records," "Best Selling Retail Folk (later Country & Western) Records) and – starting December 10 – "Country & Western Records Most Played by Folk Disk Jockeys" charts.

Other major hits

Births 
 January 19 — Crystal Gayle, younger sister of Loretta Lynn who became a star in her own right, mainly in the country-pop vein.
 May 23 — Judy Rodman, backing vocalist who enjoyed fame in the 1980s as a solo performer.
 December 7 — Lyle Evans, bass guitarist of the Western Underground.

Deaths

Further reading 
 Kingsbury, Paul, "Vinyl Hayride: Country Music Album Covers 1947–1989," Country Music Foundation, 2003
 Millard, Bob, "Country Music: 70 Years of America's Favorite Music," HarperCollins, New York, 1993
 Whitburn, Joel. "Top Country Songs 1944–2005 – 6th Edition." 2005.

References

Country
Country music by year